Nowdeh (also Romanized as Nūdeh; also known as Now Deh-e Najafābād) is a village in Siyavashan Rural District, in the Central District of Ashtian County, Markazi Province, Iran. At the 2006 census, its population was 258, in 88 families.

References 

Populated places in Ashtian County